RBYC or R.B.Y.C. may refer to:

 'Royal Barbados Yacht Club (founded 1924, and now the Barbados Yacht Club)
 Royal County of Berkshire Yacht Club (founded 1994)
 Royal Bermuda Yacht Club (founded 1844)
 Royal Bombay Yacht Club (founded 1846)
 Royal Brighton Yacht Club (founded 1875)
 Royal Burnham Yacht Club (founded 1895)